Prospero Rebiba (died 1593) was a Roman Catholic prelate who served as Titular Patriarch of Constantinople (1573–1593) and Bishop of Troia (1560–1593).

Biography
On 4 Sep 1560, Prospero Rebiba was appointed Bishop of Troia by Pope Gregory XIII, upon the resignation of his uncle and predecessor, Cardinal Scipione Rebiba.

On 26 Aug 1573, he was also appointed Titular Patriarch of Constantinople by Pope Clement VIII, in succession to his uncle, Cardinal Rebiba, who resigned in his favor.

In 1592 he was appointed as Bishop of Catania, but he died before taking canonical possession of the diocese. He served as Bishop of Troia and Titular Patriarch of Constantinople until his death in 1593.

Episcopal succession
While bishop, he was the principal co-consecrator of:
Pietro Giacomo Malombra, Bishop of Cariati e Cerenzia (1568);
Ludovico de Torres (archbishop), Archbishop of Monreale (1573); and
Enrico Cini, Bishop of Alife (1586).

References

External links and additional sources
 (for Chronology of Bishops) 
 (for Chronology of Bishops) 
 (for Chronology of Bishops) 
 (for Chronology of Bishops) 

16th-century Italian Roman Catholic bishops
Bishops appointed by Pope Gregory XIII
Bishops appointed by Pope Clement VIII
1593 deaths